Acianthera boliviana is a species of orchid plant native to Bolivia.

References 

boliviana
Flora of Bolivia
Plants described in 1912